Year 217 (CCXVII; ISO year +217; Holocene calendar year 10217; 1733 BP) was a common year of the Julian calendar.

217 may also refer to:

 217 (number)
 217 BC/BCE; a year (ISO year -216; Holocene calendar year 9784; 2166 BP)

Places
 217 Eudora, a main-belt asteroid, the 217th asteroid registered
 217P/LINEAR, a comet, the 217th periodic comet registered
 Rural Municipality of Lipton No. 217 (RM 217), Saskatchewan, Canada
 Area code 217, telephone area code for Central Illinois, United States
 217th Street (Manhattan), New York City, New York, United States
 Route 217, see List of highways numbered 217
 Old Fort 217 (Indian reserve), Wood Buffalo, Alberta, Canada; of the Mikisew Cree First Nation 
 Morin Lake 217 (Indian reserve), la Ronge Lake, Saskatchewan, Canada; of the Lac La Ronge Indian Band 
 Constituency PP-217 (Khanewal-VI), Punjab, India; a provincial constituency
 NA-217 (Sanghar-III), Pakistan; a national constituency

Military

Military unit numbered 217
 Unit 217 Israeli counter-terrorism unit
 No. 217 Squadron RAF, UK Royal Air Force
 No. 217 Maintenance Unit RAF, UK Royal Air Force
 217th (1st London) Army Field Company, Royal Engineers, UK
 217th Infantry Division (Wehrmacht), Nazi Germany
 217th Division (People's Republic of China)
 217th Guards Airborne Regiment of the USSR and then Russia

Naval ship with pennant number 217

 , a U.S. Navy WWII tugboat
 , a U.S. Navy WWII Admirable-class minesweeper
 , a U.S. Navy interwar Clemson-class destroyer
 , a U.S. Navy WWII Buckley-class destroyer escort (frigate)
 , a Royal Australian Navy 1970s Fremantle-class patrol boat
 , a U.S. Navy WWII rescue and salvage ship
 , a UK Royal Navy WWII Algerine-class minesweeper
 ,a UK Royal Navy WWII River-class frigate
 , U.S. Navy WWII landing ship
 , a UK Royal Navy WWII S-class submarine
 , U.S. Navy WWII Gato-class submarine
 , a Nazi Germany WWII Type VIID submarine
 , a U.S. Coast Guard 1930s lighthouse tender

Nuclear chemistry
 Biunseptium (Bus), element 217; a theoretical nuclear chemical element with 217 protons; see extended periodic table

Isotope 217
Nuclear chemical isotopes with a total of 217 protons and neutrons:
 Astatine-217
 Bismuth-217
 Polonium-217
 Protactinium-217
 Radium-217
 Radon-217
 Thorium-217
 Uranium-217

Other uses
 Flight 217 (disambiguation)

See also

 
 21700 (disambiguation)
 2170 (disambiguation)